Chilobrachys is a genus of Asian tarantulas that was first described by Ferdinand Anton Franz Karsch in 1892. They are found in India, Myanmar, Malaysia, China, Vietnam, Thailand and Sri Lanka. They are usually medium or large-sized, and they can stridulate by using small spines present on the chelicerae.

Diagnosis 

They have special stridulating organs in their chelicerae, which are made of short spines. Males have a palpal bulb which ends in a long and slender blade like spine, females have one pair of spermatheca. The anterior eyes form almost a straight line. Their legs have a narrower scapulae at the tip of the metatarsus.

Species
 it contains thirty-one species, found in Asia:
Chilobrachys andersoni (Pocock, 1895) – India, Myanmar, Malaysia
Chilobrachys annandalei Simon, 1901 – Malaysia
Chilobrachys assamensis Hirst, 1909 – India
Chilobrachys bicolor (Pocock, 1895) – Myanmar
Chilobrachys brevipes (Thorell, 1897) – Myanmar
Chilobrachys dominus Lin & Li, 2022 - China
Chilobrachys dyscolus (Simon, 1886) – Vietnam
Chilobrachys femoralis Pocock, 1900 – India
Chilobrachys fimbriatus Pocock, 1899 – India
Chilobrachys flavopilosus (Simon, 1884) – India, Myanmar
Chilobrachys fumosus (Pocock, 1895) – India
Chilobrachys guangxiensis (Yin & Tan, 2000) – China
Chilobrachys hardwickei (Pocock, 1895) – India
Chilobrachys himalayensis (Tikader, 1977) – India
Chilobrachys huahini Schmidt & Huber, 1996 – Thailand
Chilobrachys hubei Song & Zhao, 1988 – China
Chilobrachys jinchengi Lin & Li, 2022 - China
Chilobrachys jonitriantisvansickleae Nanayakkara, Sumanapala & Kirk, 2019 – Sri Lanka
Chilobrachys khasiensis (Tikader, 1977) – India
Chilobrachys liboensis Zhu & Zhang, 2008 – China
Chilobrachys lubricus Yu, S. Y. Zhang, F. Zhang, Li & Yang, 2021 - China
Chilobrachys nitelinus Karsch, 1892 (type) – Sri Lanka
Chilobrachys oculatus (Thorell, 1895) – Myanmar
Chilobrachys paviei (Simon, 1886) – Thailand
Chilobrachys pococki (Thorell, 1897) – Myanmar
Chilobrachys sericeus (Thorell, 1895) – Myanmar
Chilobrachys soricinus (Thorell, 1887) – Myanmar
Chilobrachys stridulans (Wood Mason, 1877) – India
Chilobrachys subarmatus (Thorell, 1891) – India (Nicobar Isands)
Chilobrachys thorelli Pocock, 1900 – India
Chilobrachys tschankhoensis Schenkel, 1963 – China (Nomen dubnium)

In synonymy:
Chilobrachys decoratus (Tikader, 1977) = Chilobrachys fimbriatus Pocock, 1899
Chilobrachys jingzhao Zhu, Song & Li, 2001 = Chilobrachys guangxiensis Yin & Tan, 2000
One species has been changed to Selenocosmia:

 Chilobrachys samarae Giltay, 1935 → Selenocosmia samarae

See also
 List of Theraphosidae species

References

Theraphosidae genera
Spiders of Asia
Taxa named by Ferdinand Karsch
Theraphosidae